Precarity (also precariousness) is a precarious existence, lacking in predictability, job security, material or psychological welfare. The social class defined by this condition has been termed the precariat.

Catholic origins
Léonce Crenier, a Catholic monk who had previously been active as an anarcho-communist, may have established the English usage. In 1952 the term was documented by Dorothy Day, writing for the Catholic Worker Movement:

Theories
It is a term of everyday usage as Precariedad, Precariedade, Précarité, or Precarietà in a number of European countries, where it refers to the widespread condition of temporary, flexible, contingent, casual, intermittent work in postindustrial societies.

While contingent labor has been a constant of capitalist societies since the industrial revolution, Michael Hardt and Antonio Negri have argued that the flexible labor force has now moved from the peripheral position it had under Fordism to a core position in the process of capitalist accumulation under Post-Fordism, which is thought to be increasingly based on the casualized efforts of affective, creative, immaterial labor. 

For philosopher Judith Butler, all human life is precarious, as all lives can be 'expunged at will or by accident' and precariousness is ineradicably part of human nature. Precariousness is living socially and recognising that one's life is always in the hands of and dependent upon the other.

Precariat 

In sociology, precariat refers to the social class formed by people with no job security, or no prospect of regular employment, distinct from the lumpenproletariat. The term is a neologism obtained by merging precarious with proletariat.

The precariat class has been emerging in advanced societies such as Japan, where it includes over 20 million so-called "freeters". The young precariat class in Europe became a serious issue in the early part of the 21st century.

Precarious lives 
For Butler, while all lives are equally defined by precariousness, some lives are more precarious. In Frames of War, this is illustrated in the political cultures of post-9/11 America: some lives are not grievable because they are not first recognised as living. Social norms and institutions maximise the precariousness of some and minimise that of others.

Combatting precarity

Global justice movement
Around 2000, the word started being used in its English usage by some global justice movement (sometimes identified with antiglobalization) activists (Marches Européennes contre le chômage la précarité et les exclusions - European Marches against unemployment, precarity and social exclusion), and also in EU official reports on social welfare. But it was in the strikes of young part-timers at McDonald's and Pizza Hut in winter 2000, that the first political union network emerged in Europe explicitly devoted to fighting precarity: Stop Précarité, with links to AC!, CGT, SUD, CNT, Trotskyists and other elements of the French radical left.

"San Precario"
February 29 is the feast day of San Precario, the patron saint of precarious workers, who – together with his feast day – was created by the Chainworkers at the Milanese space Reload where the 2004 EuroMayDay was organised with others, including the Critical Mass group. The Milan Critical Mass already had its own patron saint, "Santa Graziella" (Graziella is the brand name of a popular Italian folding bicycle).

San Precario was originally conceived as a male saint. The saint's first public appearance was at a Sunday supermarket opening on February 29, 2004: 

A statue was carried in the streets, preceded by assorted clergy including a cardinal reciting prayers over a loudspeaker, and followed by pious people.

ChainWorkers then performed a hoax during the 2005 Milan Fashion Week, creating a fictive stylist, Serpica Naro, whose name was an anagram of "San Precario". According to the groups, the name functions like a multiple user name or myth such as Luther Blissett and quote the Wu Ming collective in giving theoretical coherence, although it is mostly seen as a détournement of the Catholic concept of patron saints.

See also 
Catholic social teaching
Christian anarchism
Directive on services in the internal market, also known as "Bolkestein Directive".
Endo contractualization
First Employment Contract (CPE)
Flexicurity
Gig worker
Labour market flexibility
McJob
New Employment Contract (CNE)
Precarious work
Tenure
Wage slavery

References

Bibliography

 Standing, Guy (2011) The Precariat: The New Dangerous Class  (Bloomsbury Academic)
 Thörnquist, Annette & Engstrand, Åsa-Karin (eds.) (2011) Precarious Employment in Perspective. Old and New Challenges to Working Conditions in Sweden. Work & Society. Vol. 70. Bruxelles: Peter Lang. 
 Lorey, Isabell. (2015) 

Precarious work
Community organizing
Corporate crime
Economic sociology
Feminism and social class
Labor disputes
Labor relations
Working conditions

de:Prekarisierung